Pristimantis librarius is a species of frog in the family Strabomantidae.
It is endemic to Ecuador.
Its natural habitat is tropical moist lowland forests.
It is threatened by habitat loss.

References

librarius
Amphibians of Ecuador
Endemic fauna of Ecuador
Amphibians described in 1994
Taxonomy articles created by Polbot